The Global Initiative for Traditional Systems of Health (GIFTS) is a program launched in 1993 at the headquarters of the Pan American Health Organization in Washington, D.C. GIFTS states its purpose of "bringing into policy focus the importance of traditional (indigenous) medicine in the daily lives and health care of the majority of the population of most emerging economies."

External links 
 Researchers of Indigenous Medicine
Treating HIV in South Africa -- A Tale of Two Systems
Institutional heterogeneity in globalization: Co-development of western-allopathic medicine and traditional-alternative medicine 
On the First International Meeting of the Research Initiative on Traditional Antimalarial Methods (RITAM)
Traditional Medicine Growing Needs and Potential - WHO Policy Perspectives on Medicines, No. 002, May 2002
Traditional Chinese Medicine: a global trend, viable alternative to Western medicine
Medicinal plants for forest conservation and health care
Collaboration with Traditional Healers in theProvision of Skin Care for All in Africa
Turning to traditional medicines in fight against malaria

References 

Traditional medicine